Amanda Chou Hsiao-han is a Taiwanese actress.

Filmography

Television series

Film

References

External links
 
 

1984 births
21st-century Taiwanese actresses
Actresses from Taipei
Taiwanese television actresses
Taiwanese film actresses
Living people
Feng Chia University alumni